Vulcan Presenting Venus with Arms for Aeneas is an oil-on-canvas painting by François Boucher, executed in 1757 and now in the Louvre in Paris. He produced it as the basis for one of a set of tapestries on The Loves of the Gods. It depicts the homely but muscular Vulcan on the ground in the right, offering up to the more celestial Venus the weapons he has forged for her son Aeneas.

See also
Apollo in the Forge of Vulcan (1630) by Diego Velázquez in the Prado Museum, Madrid
Venus at the furnace of Vulcan (1710) by Luigi Garzi at the Palazzo Buonaccorsi, Macerata

References

1757 paintings
Paintings in the Louvre by French artists
Mythological paintings by François Boucher
Paintings of Venus
Paintings based on the Aeneid
Paintings of Vulcan (mythology)